Gim Bo-eun (born 8 December 1997) is a South Korean handball player for Gyeong and the South Korean national team. She made her Olympic debut representing South Korea at the 2020 Summer Olympics.

Career 
She represented South Korea at the 2014 Summer Youth Olympics and was part of the South Korean team which defeated Russia 32-31 in the final to claim the gold medal in the girls handball tournament.

She was part of the national team which finished at thirteenth position at the 2017 World Women's Handball Championship. She was also a member of the Korean team which won gold medal in the women's team event at the 2018 Asian Games.

She was included in the South Korean squad in the women's handball competition for the 2020 Summer Olympics.

References

1997 births
Living people
South Korean female handball players
Handball players at the 2014 Summer Youth Olympics
Youth Olympic gold medalists for South Korea
Handball players at the 2018 Asian Games
Asian Games gold medalists for South Korea
Asian Games medalists in handball
Medalists at the 2018 Asian Games
Handball players at the 2020 Summer Olympics
Olympic handball players of South Korea